The Falcon Lake Incident is the fourth studio album by Canadian singer-songwriter Jim Bryson, released October 19, 2010, on Kelp Records and MapleMusic. The album was recorded with The Weakerthans, at a cottage on Falcon Lake in Manitoba. Other guest musicians on the album include Gord Sinclair (of The Tragically Hip) and Jill Barber.

Track listing
 "Raised All Wrong"
 "Metal Girls"
 "Fell Off the Dock"
 "Wild Folk"
 "Constellation"
 "Freeways in the Frontyard"
 "Up All Night"
 "Kissing Cousins"
 "Decidedly"
 "Anything and All"

References

2010 albums
Jim Bryson albums